The Men's 10,000 metres race of the 2015 World Single Distance Speed Skating Championships was held on 12 February 2015.

Results
The race was started at 19:33.

References

Men's 10000 metres